Acid Horse was a one-off collaborative side project between two industrial music pioneers, Ministry and Cabaret Voltaire. Only one single, "No Name, No Slogan", was released in 1989 on Wax Trax! Records. The band name combines the slang terms for LSD (acid) and heroin (horse), and plays on the title of the then-popular acid house movement.

As with many other Ministry side projects, such as PTP and Revolting Cocks, the band members' identities are masked by pseudonyms. The members are as follows:

Alien Dog Star - Al Jourgensen
Gallopin' Scorpiosaddlebutt - Chris Connelly
Biff - Stephen Mallinder
Tennessee King - Paul Barker
Harold Sandoz - Richard H. Kirk

Musically, Acid Horse resembles fellow Ministry side project PTP, in that it blends an upbeat electronic rhythm section with catchy guitar work. Option editor Sandy Masuo described it as "an unlikely collision of house-style mixing and spaghetti western ambience à la Ennio Morricone"; in the same article, Jourgensen said that despite being able to work with one of industrial's prominent acts, the collaboration was also disappointing:

Acid Horse was formed after Mallinder and Kirk, the "pioneers" Jourgensen was referring to, had come to Chicago to work with house producer Marshall Jefferson.

Goldmine author Jo-Ann Greene pointed out that "No Name, No Slogan" is "strangely reminiscent" of English synthpop duo Blancmange's 1983 single "Blind Vision". Evidence that "No Name, No Slogan" might have been written using "Blind Vision" as a reference track is available on Soundcloud.

References

External links
 artist information/discography page at CyberNoise

American industrial rock musical groups
Musical groups established in 1989
Musical groups disestablished in 1989
Wax Trax! Records artists